Bleu Louie Landau (born 5 April 2005) is an English actor, known for his role as Dennis Rickman Jnr in the BBC soap opera EastEnders from September 2015 to February 2020. In 2017 he starred in Guy Richie's film King Arthur: Legend of the Sword as the role of Blue alongside Jude Law, David Beckham and Charlie Hunnam. He also appeared in Sky comedy drama Code 404 as Reece.

Life and career
Bleu Louie Landau was born on 5 April 2005 in Bexley, Kent, in the United Kingdom  and grew up on the Isle of Sheppey. In 2015, Landau replaced Harry Hickles in the role of Dennis Rickman on the BBC soap opera EastEnders. For his role, he was nominated for Best Young Performance at the 2017 British Soap Awards. The character was killed off in a boat accident aired over the 35th anniversary of EastEnders in February 2020; Landau's last scenes aired on 21 February. In 2017, he made his film debut in Guy Ritchie's film King Arthur: Legend of the Sword, he played Blue, Backlack's son. Landau is also a model, and has worked for Avon, M&S, La Petite, and River Island.

Filmography

Awards and nominations

References

External links
 

2005 births
21st-century English male actors
Living people
English male child actors
English male film actors
English male soap opera actors
People from Bexley
Male actors from London